The following is an incomprehensive list of the statutes of China, classified and ordered according to the Ministry of Justice of the People's Republic of China. The laws in each sections are listed in chronological order of the year they were passed.

Constitution and related laws

Constitution

Constitution-related laws

Civil and commercial laws

Administrative laws

General administrative laws

Special administrative laws

Economic laws

Social laws

Criminal laws

Procedural & Non-procedural laws

Procedural laws

Non-procedural laws

See also
 Law of the People's Republic of China
 Chinese law
 Traditional Chinese law

References

External links 
Criminal Law of the People's Republic of China Mainland China criminal law on Congressional-Executive Commission on China web-site
Official Site about Judicial System of PRC A site with judicial news,  library of laws and regulations sponsored by the Supreme People's Court of the PRC

Statutes